The Etiwanda Depot is a former railway station of the Pacific Electric Railway, located in Rancho Cucamonga, California. The station was principally in service for the Upland–San Bernardino Line.

History
Freight operations to Etiwanda began on December 27, 1913. The station building opened on January 25, 1914, and was constructed by the Pacific Electric. The Upland–San Bernardino Line began full operation on July 11, but cars may had run here from Pomona as early as the station's opening. Passenger service was discontinued in 1941, but the depot continued to function as a freight depot until 1960.

After being sold by the railroad, the property was used as a lumber yard until 2004. The building was added to the National Register of Historic Places on March 21, 2011.

See also
Lynwood Pacific Electric Railway Depot — another existing PE station building listed on the NRHP
Watts Station — another existing PE station building listed on the NRHP

References

External links
 Etiwanda depot 1937 photograph via Los Angeles Public Library

Pacific Electric stations
Rancho Cucamonga, California
Railway stations in the United States opened in 1914
Railway stations closed in 1941
1914 establishments in California
1941 disestablishments in California
Railway stations on the National Register of Historic Places in California